Aleksandr Vladimirovich Skvortsov (born 6 March 1982) is a former Russian professional football player.

Club career
He played 4 seasons in the Russian Football National League for FC Zvezda Irkutsk, FC Volgar-Gazprom-2 Astrakhan and FC Gazovik Orenburg.

References

External links
 

1982 births
Living people
Russian footballers
Association football midfielders
FC Zvezda Irkutsk players
FC Volgar Astrakhan players
FC Orenburg players
FC Tyumen players
FC Vityaz Podolsk players
Russian expatriate footballers
Expatriate footballers in Germany